The Armenia–EU Comprehensive and Enhanced Partnership Agreement or CEPA is a partnership agreement between the European Union and Armenia. The agreement advances the bilateral relations between the European Union and Armenia to a new, partnership level and regulates cooperation in political and economic sectors, while enhancing trade relations. The agreement develops these areas further, providing a long-term basis for integrating and strengthening EU–Armenia relations. The agreement is also designed to bring Armenian laws and regulations gradually closer to the EU acquis.

Background 
Armenia's relations with the EU had previously been governed by the Partnership and Cooperation Agreement (PCA) (signed in 1996 and in force since 1999), which served as the legal framework for EU–Armenia bilateral relations. Armenia and the EU began negotiating a new and more complex Association Agreement, which had included a Deep and Comprehensive Free Trade Area agreement, to replace the old PCA in July 2010. Negotiations were finalized in July 2013 and Armenia (along with Georgia, Moldova and Ukraine) was set to sign the new Association Agreement with the EU during the Eastern Partnership summit in November 2013. However, the government of Armenia, led by former President Serzh Sargsyan had suddenly broken off negotiations to pursue membership in the Russian-led Eurasian Union. Other political parties in Armenia criticized the governments last-minute decision to cancel the Association Agreement with the EU and vocally opposed Armenia's membership in the Eurasian Union. Many criticized Russia for pressuring President Sargsyan to abandon the deal with the EU.

Following a period of brief uncertainty between Armenia and the EU, bilateral negotiations resumed on restructuring the relationship. In January 2015 the EU commissioner for European Neighbourhood Policy and Enlargement, Johannes Hahn stated that the EU was willing to sign a revised Association Agreement with Armenia, but that any new deal would exclude a free trade agreement as that would contradict Armenia's membership in the Eurasian Customs Union. Renewed negotiations were launched in December 2015. After extensive negotiations, Armenia and the EU finalized the Comprehensive and Enhanced Partnership Agreement during a ceremony in Brussels. The new Comprehensive and Enhanced Partnership Agreement will expand and broaden the scope of relations between the EU and Armenia. It was signed by Armenia and all EU member states on 24 November 2017. The agreement was fully ratified by all 31 parties on 25 January 2021 and officially entered into force on 1 March 2021.

The Standing Committee on European Integration is responsible for ensuring the terms and agreements of CEPA are implemented.

What is CEPA 

The agreement constitutes an important step towards the increased political and economic involvement of the European Union in the South Caucasus. The scope of the new agreement is comprehensive and covers a wide range of cooperation in economic, trade and political areas. The agreement develops these areas further; providing a long-term basis for further deepening EU–Armenia relations. By intensifying political dialogue and improving cooperation in a broad range of areas, the agreement lays the foundations for more effective bilateral engagement with Armenia. Furthermore, the agreement seeks to foster result-oriented and practical cooperation between all parties for achieving peace, security and stability on the European continent.

Supposed benefits of CEPA 
The agreement includes the EU's standard political clauses on democracy, justice, and human rights. It also contains provisions on cooperation in areas such as transport and infrastructure, energy, health, the environment, climate change, taxation, education and culture, employment and social affairs, banking and insurance, media freedom, minority rights, industrial policy, agriculture and rural development, tourism, research and innovation, mining, and counter-terrorism. In addition, it covers other extensive democratic reforms, legal cooperation, strengthening the rule of law, combating money laundering, and fighting organized crime and corruption.

The agreement also contains a substantive trade title with important commitments in several trade policy areas. These will improve conditions for bilateral EU–Armenia trade, while taking full account of Armenia's obligations as a member of the Eurasian Union. They will ensure a better regulatory environment for economic operators in areas such as trade in services and goods, setting up and running companies, capital movements, government procurement and intellectual property rights, sustainable development, and competition. The agreement encourages Armenian companies to sell more goods and services to the EU and EU companies to open subsidiaries in Armenia, which will contribute to economic growth and job creation. The Comprehensive and Enhanced Partnership Agreement can be seen as a “lite” version of an EU Free Trade Agreement, in which 96% of Armenian goods may enter the EU's single market with zero tariffs. As of 2020, the EU is Armenia's biggest export market.

The agreement also supports enhancing mobility between citizens of the EU and Armenia, while reconfirming the opening of negotiations on visa-free travel for Armenian citizens to the Schengen Area.

Since the signing of CEPA, Armenia was under negotiations to join the European Common Aviation Area. The agreement to establish a Common Aviation Area between the EU and Armenia removes market restrictions and associates Armenia to the EU internal aviation market by harmonizing its aviation legislation with EU standards by implementing a large part of EU aviation rules. On 15 November 2021, Armenia and the EU finalized negotiations of the Common Aviation Area Agreement between the two sides. The benefits of the agreement include new air transport opportunities, more direct connections and economic benefits to both sides. All EU airlines will be able to operate direct flights from anywhere in the EU to any airport in Armenia, and vice versa for Armenian airlines. All limitations and restrictions on flights between Armenia and the EU will be removed.

Ratification 
In order for CEPA to enter into force, all member states of the European Union, the EU itself, and the European Atomic Energy Community (EAEC) must ratify the agreement. As of 25 January 2021, all 31 parties have fully ratified CEPA. This includes:

Developments

EU membership perspective 

According to the Eastern Partnership policy, Armenia can become a member of the European Union. A 2020 poll found that over 40% of Armenians were in favor of EU membership. There are several political parties in Armenia which are opposed to Armenia's current membership in the Eurasian Economic Union. Bright Armenia, the Free Democrats, Heritage, the European Party of Armenia, and the Republic Party each support Armenia's withdrawal from the Eurasian Economic Union and wish to renegotiate a full Association Agreement with a Deep and Comprehensive Free Trade Area between the EU and Armenia. Several political parties also support Armenia's eventual EU membership bid and have campaigned to begin EU accession negotiations.

In October 2019, the Deputy Prime Minister of Armenia Tigran Avinyan stated that Armenia and the EU have a completely different level of relationship following the 2018 Armenian revolution. The Minister confirmed that the revolution strengthened ties between Armenia and the EU as both share the same democratic values. The Minister further stated that, "This new political situation is completely in line with the EU’s views". Avinyan also made clear that in the future, Armenia will have to decide whether or not to pursue an EU membership bid. The Minister advised that any decision for Armenia to join the European Union would have to be brought before the people and that future accession of Armenia to the EU would only occur following Armenia's complete withdrawal from the Eurasian Economic Union.

In December 2019, following the eighth Euronest Parliamentary Assembly, a resolution was passed by all members outlining various EU integration goals to be achieved by 2030. The resolution affirms that the process of EU enlargement is open to Eastern Partnership member states and that future enlargement of the EU will be mutually beneficial for both the EU and Eastern Partnership members. The resolution  praised the progress made in Armenia following the 2018 Armenian revolution. The resolution also stated that, "Armenia is the only country in Europe to transition from being a hybrid regime in 2017 to a democracy in 2018" and that the ratification of the Comprehensive and Enhanced Partnership Agreement by the Armenian Parliament in April 2018 is considered evidence of a strategically reinforced partnership between Armenia and EU.

In June 2020, the Chair of the European Parliament stated, "We believe that the successful implementation of the comprehensive reforms by Armenia, in areas such as the rule of law, justice and fight against corruption, will create new incentives for an ambitious path towards European integration and the next steps to be taken by Armenia and the EU in the next decade". Meanwhile, the Ministry of Foreign Affairs of Armenia confirmed that the development of the partnership with the European Union is one of the most important directions of foreign policy of the Republic of Armenia.

Reactions 
: Deputy Prime Minister, Mher Grigoryan stated, "The agreement boosted Armenia–EU ties and also served as the foundation for various areas for outlining future reforms. Its implementation is one of the top priorities of our government."
: The Deputy Prime Minister of Bulgaria, Ekaterina Zakharieva, stated, "Bulgaria attached special importance to the full entry into force of the Armenia–EU Comprehensive and Enhanced Partnership Agreement."
: The Foreign Minister of Estonia, Eva-Maria Liimets, confirmed Estonia's willingness to give new impetus to the cooperation in spheres of mutual interest with Armenia and stressed that CEPA will be an effective toolkit for the implementation of democratic, human rights and rule of law reforms in Armenia.
: The Vice-President of the European Commission, Josep Borrell stated, "The agreement sends a strong signal that the EU and Armenia are committed to supporting democratic principles, the rule of law, and a broad reform agenda. CEPA plays an important role for the modernization of Armenia, in particular through legislative approximation to EU norms in many sectors."
: The French Foreign Ministry announced that France welcomes the conclusion of negotiations on the EU–Armenia CEPA. The Ministry stated that, "CEPA will create new opportunities for trade and investment while protecting French and European geographical indications."
: During a meeting with Armenian Prime Minister in Berlin, the German Bundestag President Wolfgang Schäuble advised he was pleased with the ratification of CEPA and remains supportive of Armenia’s judicial reform. In return, Armenian Prime Minister stated, "Armenia has recorded tangible progress in its international ratings in regards to democracy. Our government sets another important goal in developing relations with Germany."
: Lithuania’s Deputy Foreign Minister Arnoldas Pranckevičius stated, "CEPA can bring Armenia higher standards of democracy and rule of law, greener environment and more business opportunities. It is a cause for celebration for Lithuania. Because we are stronger together,” he noted.
: Zvezda TV, the channel of the Russian Ministry of Defense, claimed that "Armenia was going to associate itself with the EU, just like Ukraine." After official complaints from Yerevan, Zvezda TV’s president sent a letter of apology to the Armenian ambassador in Russia.
: The Minister of Foreign Affairs of Spain,  Arancha González Laya, expressed confidence that the full and effective implementation of the CEPA will give a tangible new impetus to the promotion of mutually beneficial cooperation between Armenia, the EU, and EU member states.
: The Swedish embassy in Yerevan proclaimed that, "The agreement we have signed will have a real impact on people's lives, a positive one, both in Armenia and in the European Union."

See also 

Armenia–European Union relations
Armenia in the Council of Europe
Eastern Partnership
Euronest Parliamentary Assembly
European Integration
European Neighbourhood Policy
European Union Mission in Armenia
EU Strategy for the South Caucasus
Foreign relations of Armenia
Foreign relations of the European Union
Potential enlargement of the European Union

References

External links
Armenia–EU Comprehensive and Enhanced Partnership Agreement on EUR-Lex

2017 in Armenia
2017 treaties
European integration
Foreign relations of Armenia
Armenia–European Union relations
Treaties entered into by the European Union
Treaties of Armenia